Dominique Othenin-Girard (born 13 February 1958) is a Swiss-French film director, producer and screenwriter.  He is known for films such as Halloween 5: The Revenge of Michael Myers, The Crusaders and After Darkness which was nominated for a Golden Bear Award. Othenin-Girard is also active in promoting awareness for Down syndrome.

Early years
Dominique Othenin-Girard was born in 1958 in Le Locle, Neuchâtel, Switzerland, to French painter Ivan Othenin-Girard and Sonia Calame. His early years were spent traveling to lands that were in culturally different from his native Switzerland; first for an extended stay in Greece and then to live in Iran where his father established the Fine Arts Program in Tehran. At 7 years old he returned to Switzerland with his mother, brother and sister, where he remained until going to the United States as an exchange student when he was 16 years old. He began studying photography and was accepted at the London Film School.

Film director
Othenin-Girard graduated from the London Film School with a Masters of Arts in directing and editing. In 1982 he founded his own production company, Dog Productions, to produce, write and direct his first feature film, the psychosocial thriller After Darkness (1984), which was nominated for a Golden Bear at the 35th Berlin International Film Festival. He continued to direct film for the TSR and British HTV until 1987 when he moved to Los Angeles. An opportunity to direct the horror movie Night Angel showed Othenin-Girard's talent in this genre, and he went on to direct and co-write Halloween 5: The Revenge of Michael Myers.

In 1990, Othenin-Girard’s sister-in-law, who has Down syndrome, moved in with his family. This inspired him to tell the story of a family with a child with Down's syndrome. To accomplish this he founded the production company Alhena Films SA in Los Angeles to co-write and direct the family drama Sandra: c’est la vie (1992). He took this theme up again by co-writing and directing the German television film Florian: Love with All His Heart, which was RTL's highest rated film and received praise from Down syndrome advocate groups.

In the 1990s and 2000s Othenin-Girard worked in Germany, the US, and Italy, directing films on topics as diverse as organ transplant and action thrillers. During this period one of his major works was The Crusaders, an epic romantic miniseries about the Christian crusaders in the 11th century. He continued producing film for television, for RTS.

After 35 years mostly outside his native land he returned to Switzerland in 2010 to direct, co-create and co-write a 4-hour historical docudrama, Les Suisses, chronicling the history of the Swiss Federation from the 14th to the 19th century. The epic story would take three years to complete and was shot French, German, and Italian; it would represent Othenin-Girard's tribute to his homeland.

In the winter of 1999, Othenin-Girard first traveled to China. In 2007 Othenin-Girard went to Shanghai when his film Der Todestunnel (2004) inspired by the Mont Blanc Tunnel tragedy was nominated for the Shanghai Magnolia Award. These trips were only the start of many which would culminate in a more permanent move. Othenin-Girard is now based in China where he is collaborating with local production companies and is involved in writing and directing his next feature films.

Theatre director
In 2012, Othenin-Girard produced and directed the one woman show by Rachel Monnat "Rachel et ses Amants". The performance work went to the 2013 Avignon Theater Festival and received rave reviews in the press, before beginning a European Tour (2014).

Currently, Othenin-Girard is one of the Artist committed to the Khloros International Concerts.  In 2013 he directed the Khloros Concert "Siem Réap" in Angkor Vat, which was aired live and transmitted in Phnom Peng Royal Park, in 2014, he co-directed the filming of the Khloros Concert at the Forbidden City Concert Hall, Beijing, (with ARTE and CCTV) and in 2015, Othenin-Girard will direct the German opera "Freischutz" (Weber) at the Guangzhou Opera House.

Partial filmography

Film and Television

Nominations and awards
(For films directed, including category of best actor)

References

External links

RTS.CH Les Suisses (2013) 

1958 births
Living people
People from Le Locle
Alumni of the London Film School
Swiss film directors
Swiss screenwriters
Male screenwriters
French-language film directors
Horror film directors
Swiss-French people